Rafik Belghali (born 7 June 2002) is an professional footballer who plays as a winger for Belgian First Division B club Lommel. Born in Belgium, he represents Algeria at under-23 international level.

Belghali was born in Belgium to Algerian parents.

International career
In March 2022, Belghali was called up by Noureddine Ould Ali to the Algeria under-23 national team for the first time for a pair of friendlies against Mauritania.

References

2002 births
Association football wingers
Living people
Belgian footballers
Belgian people of Algerian descent
Challenger Pro League players
Lommel S.K. players
PSV Eindhoven players
Footballers from Flemish Brabant
Algeria under-23 international footballers
Sportspeople from Leuven
Belgian expatriate sportspeople in the Netherlands
Belgian expatriate footballers
Expatriate footballers in the Netherlands
S.V. Zulte Waregem players